In personam is a Latin phrase meaning "against a particular person". In a lawsuit in which the case is against a specific individual, that person must be served with a summons and complaint (E&W known as Particulars of Claim (CPR 1999) to give the court jurisdiction to try the case, and the judgment applies to that person and is called an "in personam judgment". 

In personam is distinguished from in rem, which applies to property or "all the world" instead of a specific person. This technical distinction is important to determine where to file a lawsuit and how to serve a defendant. In personam means that a judgment can be enforceable against the person wherever he/she is. On the other hand, if the lawsuit is to determine title to property (in rem) then the action must be filed where the property exists and is only enforceable there.

See also
Personal jurisdiction
quasi in rem
in rem
sui iuris
Prerogative legislation

References

Latin legal terminology
Civil procedure